Marion Francis Forst (September 3, 1910 – June 2, 2007) was an American clergyman of the Roman Catholic Church. He served as Bishop of Dodge City from 1960 to 1976, after which he served as an auxiliary bishop of the Archdiocese of Kansas City in Kansas (1976–1986). At the time of his death, he was the oldest Catholic bishop in the United States.

Biography
One of eight children, Marion Forst was born in St. Louis, Missouri, to Frank and Bertha (née Gulath) Forst. An uncle and two brothers were also priests. He learned to serve as an altar boy in the first grade, and by the time he was in fourth grade he was teaching other boys how to serve. He studied at Kenrick Seminary in Webster Groves, and was ordained to the priesthood by Archbishop John J. Glennon on June 10, 1934. He then served as a curate at Blessed Sacrament Church in Denver, Colorado, until 1936, when he returned to Missouri to serve at Queen of Peace Church in Glendale. He was a curate at St. Theresa Church in St. Louis (1943–1946) before serving as a chaplain to the United States Navy from 1946 to 1949. He became rector of St. Mary Cathedral in Cape Girardeau in 1949, and was named vicar general of the newly erected Diocese of Springfield-Cape Girardeau in 1956.

On January 2, 1960, Forst was appointed the second Bishop of Dodge City, Kansas, by Pope John XXIII. He received his episcopal consecration on the following March 24 from Bishop Charles Herman Helmsing, with Bishops Mark Kenny Carroll and Leo Christopher Byrne serving as co-consecrators. Between 1962 and 1965, he attended all four sessions of the Second Vatican Council, which he described as "the paramount event of all [his] episcopal years...[and] the best thing that happened to the church in the 20th century." During his tenure, he established several new offices and ministries in the diocese, including Catholic Social Service, the Office of Religious Education, Family Life Office, Religious Education for the Handicapped, the Southwest Kansas Register diocesan newspaper, Office of Mexican American Affairs, and the Youth/Young Adults Office. He was an opponent of denying federal aid to private schools, which he believed was "a smoke screen" designed "to get rid of these schools."

After sixteen years as head of the Diocese of Dodge City, Forst retired due to poor health on October 16, 1976. He was named Auxiliary Bishop of Kansas City in Kansas and Titular Bishop of Scala by Pope Paul VI on the same date. He remained in this capacity for ten years, when he resigned both posts on December 23, 1986. Forst later died at Olathe Medical Center, aged 96. At the time of his death, he was the oldest Catholic bishop in the United States; Archbishop Peter Leo Gerety assumed that distinction upon Forst's death.

References

Roman Catholic Archdiocese of St. Louis
1910 births
2007 deaths
Clergy from St. Louis
Kenrick–Glennon Seminary alumni
20th-century Roman Catholic bishops in the United States
Participants in the Second Vatican Council
United States Navy chaplains
Roman Catholic bishops of Dodge City
Roman Catholic Archdiocese of Kansas City in Kansas